The 2021 Kentucky Bank Tennis Championships was a professional tennis tournament played on outdoor hard courts. It was the 25th edition of the tournament and was part of the 2021 ATP Challenger Tour. It took place in Lexington, United States, on 26 July–1 August 2021.

Singles main draw entrants

Seeds 

 1 Rankings as of 19 July 2021.

Other entrants 
The following players received a wildcard into the singles main draw:
  Stefan Dostanic
  Liam Draxl
  Govind Nanda

The following players received entry into the singles main draw as alternates:
  Sasikumar Mukund
  Shuichi Sekiguchi

The following players received entry from the qualifying draw:
  Darian King
  Stefan Kozlov
  Aidan McHugh
  Genaro Alberto Olivieri

The following player received entry as a lucky loser:
  Edan Leshem

Champions

Singles

 Jason Kubler def.  Alejandro Tabilo 7–5, 6–7(2–7), 7–5.

Doubles

 Liam Draxl /  Stefan Kozlov def.  Alex Rybakov /  Reese Stalder 6–2, 6–7(5–7), [10–7].

References

Kentucky Bank Tennis Championships
2021 in American tennis
2021
July 2021 sports events in the United States
August 2021 sports events in the United States